Forbes is an unincorporated community in southeastern Holt County, Missouri, United States. It is located approximately five miles southeast of Oregon.

History
Forbes was laid out in 1869.  The community was named for railroad magnate John Murray Forbes. A post office called Forbes was established in 1903, and remained in operation until 1975.

References

Unincorporated communities in Holt County, Missouri
Unincorporated communities in Missouri